Radstock Co-operative Society is a small regional consumer co-operative, which was established in Radstock, Somerset, England in 1868 and today operates twenty food stores and across Somerset alongside a 1000 acre farm. It is owned and democratically controlled by its customer members, who numbered approximately 7000 in 2014. The society grew from a turnover of £15 million in 2006 to over £35m by 2016, doubling the number of stores over the period. The business has held the Fair Tax Mark since 2016.

In 2016, the society operated a large supermarket in Radstock and eighteen convenience shops in nearby areas. The society also owns Manor Farm, a dairy farm which supplies a substantial portion of the organic milk sold through UK Co-operative Stores. It previously owned a Homemaker Furniture store.

In 2020 the society obtained planning permission to replace its Radstock "superstore" with a housing and new store development. The old single-storey building was beyond economical repair, and will replaced with two three-storey buildings and a public square. In August 2020 the store was moved to temporary premises for the duration of the redevelopment.

The society participates in the British co-operative movement.  As well as supplying cheese for national distribution by the Co-operative Retail Trading Group (CRTG) through a milk processor, it obtains food goods from the CRTG.  It is a corporate member and shareholder of The Co-operative Group, a national business that is successor to the Co-operative Wholesale Society. In line with many retail co-operatives across the UK, during the late 2000s the society began converting its stores from the 1993 dark blue Co-op cloverleaf branding, to green “The co-operative food” fascias, alongside acquiring stores in Shepton Mallet and Coleford.

Locations

 Peasedown St John, 1908
 Timsbury, North Somerset, 1916
 Chilcompton, Somerset, 1919
 Chew Magna, North Somerset, 1924
 Westfield (Elm Tree Avenue), 1940s
 Radstock superstore, 1959
 Shepton Mallet, Somerset, 2008
 Glastonbury, Somerset, 2009
 Coleford, Somerset, 2009 (formerly Crossway Stores)
 Street, Somerset, 2010
 Frome, Somerset, 2011
 Westfield (Fosseway), 2012
 Farrington Gurney, 2013
 Fosseway, 2014
 Frome, Somerset Bath Road, 2015
 Trowbridge, Castle Mead, 2017
 Warminster, Victoria Road, 2017
 Weston-Super-Mare, Milton Road, 2018
 Bridgwater, Paragon Place, 2018

See also
British co-operative movement
Credit unions in the United Kingdom

References

Companies based in Somerset
Retail companies established in 1868
Consumers' co-operatives of the United Kingdom
Radstock